Naif Mohammed Jasim is an Iraqi politician and a member of the Iraqi Council of Representatives for the Sunni Arab-led Iraqi Accord Front.

He was elected in the Iraqi legislative election of December 2005 as one of the Front's 44 MPs.

In October 2007, he was arrested by United States soldiers who alleged he was at an al-Qaeda meeting in Sharqat, Salahuddin province. Jasim claimed he was attending a funeral there.

References

Members of the Council of Representatives of Iraq
Iraqi Accord Front politicians
Living people
Year of birth missing (living people)